Chilabothrus fordii, known commonly as Ford's boa or the Haitian ground boa, is a species of snake in the family Boidae.

Geographic range
C. fordii is endemic to the island of Hispaniola (both Haiti and the Dominican Republic), and on the surrounding islets of Île de la Gonâve, Isla Catalina, and Isla Saona.

Etymology
The specific name, fordii, is in honor of South African-born George Henry Ford, artist at the British Museum (Natural History), "whose merits in herpetology are well known by his truly artistical [sic] drawings".

Description
Chilabothrus fordii is a medium-sized snake.

Dorsally it has a ground color that is pale olive, yellowish, or reddish, overlaid by a series of transverse dark brown blotches, which are oval or kidney-shaped, with blackish borders. Some of these blotches may merge to form a wide wavy stripe in some places. Ventrally it is yellowish, with small brown spots.

The smooth dorsal scales are arranged in 33-43 rows. Ventrals 250-265; anal plate entire; subcaudals 70-80 also entire.

On the dorsal surface of the head, the large frontal contacts the supraoculars; the remainder is covered by small irregular plates. There are 13 or 14 upper labials, without labial pits.

Subspecies
Three subspecies are recognized, including the nominate subspecies.

Chilabothrus fordii fordii 
Chilabothrus fordii agametus 
Chilabothrus fordii manototus 

Nota bene: A trinomial authority in parentheses indicates that the subspecies was originally described in a genus other than Chilabothrus.

References

fordii
Reptiles of Haiti
Reptiles of the Dominican Republic
Endemic fauna of Hispaniola
Reptiles described in 1861
Taxa named by Albert Günther
Snakes of the Caribbean